Jason Kendall Adam (born August 4, 1991) is an American professional baseball pitcher for the Tampa Bay Rays of Major League Baseball (MLB). He has previously played in MLB for the Kansas City Royals, Toronto Blue Jays, and Chicago Cubs.

Career
In his senior season at Blue Valley Northwest High School, Adam pitched  innings with a 2.16 earned run average.  His 79 strikeouts to just 7 walks impressed scouts.

Kansas City Royals
The Kansas City Royals drafted Adam in the fifth round of the 2010 MLB draft and he signed with the Royals, forgoing his college commitment to the University of Missouri. He made his professional debut in 2011 for the Single-A Kane County Cougars, recording a 6–9 record and 4.23 ERA in 21 appearances. The next year, Adam spent the season with the High-A Wilmington Blue Rocks, pitching to a 7–12 record and 3.53 ERA in 158.0 innings pitched. In 2013, Adam played for the Double-A Northwest Arkansas Naturals, registering a 8–11 record and 5.19 ERA in 26 games. He appeared in 26 games between the Naturals and the Triple-A Omaha Storm Chasers in 2014.

Minnesota Twins
On August 11, 2014, Adam was traded to the Minnesota Twins in exchange for Josh Willingham. Adam did not play in a game in 2015 or 2016 due to injury and elected free agency on November 7, 2016.

San Diego Padres
On July 20, 2017, Adam signed a minor league deal with the San Diego Padres organization. Adam pitched 2.0 scoreless innings for the Double-A San Antonio Missions, and appeared in 7 games for the AZL Padres before he was released on August 14, 2017.

Kansas City Royals (second stint)
On August 18, 2017, Adam signed a minor league contract with the Kansas City Royals. He finished the year with the Northwest Arkansas Naturals, posting a 7.11 ERA in 5 appearances. The Royals called up Adam on May 4, 2018, and he made his major league debut the next day. In 2018, Adam appeared in 31 games, registering an ERA of 6.12 in  innings. On November 30, he was non-tendered by the Royals, making him a free agent. On December 17, 2018, the Royals re-signed Adam to a minor league contract.

Toronto Blue Jays
On March 17, 2019, Adam was traded to the Toronto Blue Jays in exchange for cash considerations. He was assigned to AAA Buffalo Bisons and put on the injured list to start the 2019 season. On August 1, the Blue Jays selected Adam's contract to the active roster. Adam earned his first major league win on August 10, pitching an inning of relief in Toronto's 5–4 victory over the New York Yankees. He finished the season with a 2.91 ERA in 23 games with the Blue Jays. He gave up the lowest percentage of hard-hit balls of all major league pitchers (20.0%). Adam became a free agent on December 2 after being non-tendered by the Blue Jays.

Chicago Cubs
On January 14, 2020, Adam signed a minor league contract with the Chicago Cubs organization. On August 16, 2020, Adam was selected to the active roster. On the season, he pitched to a 3.29 ERA and a 2–1 record with 21 strikeouts in 13.2 innings of work. Adam pitched to an 8.22 ERA in 9 appearances to begin 2021 before he was sent down to the Triple-A Iowa Cubs. On May 21, 2021, Adam underwent surgery to repair a dislocated left ankle. He was designated for assignment by the Cubs on May 25. On May 26, Adam was released by Chicago. Adam re-signed with the Cubs on a minor league contract on July 12. On September 26, Adam was selected to the 40-man and active rosters. On November 30, Adam was non-tendered by the Cubs, making him a free agent.

Tampa Bay Rays
On March 17, 2022, Adam signed a one-year deal with the Tampa Bay Rays.

On June 4, 2022, Adam, along with four other Rays teammates, opted out of wearing a Rays team logo and cap in support of LGBTQ+ Pride, during the team's annual Pride Night celebration at Tropicana Field. Adam, as the player chosen by team officials to speak for those that opted out, said that “A lot of it comes down to faith, to like a faith-based decision…we don’t want to encourage it if we believe in Jesus, who's encouraged us to live a lifestyle that would abstain from that behavior.”

Adam's salary for the 2023 season was determined by the arbitration process to be $1.775 million.

Personal life
Adam is a Christian. Adam is married to Kelsey Adam. They have three children.

References

External links

1991 births
Living people
American expatriate baseball players in Canada
Arizona League Padres players
Baseball players from Kansas
Buffalo Bisons (minor league) players
Chicago Cubs players
Dunedin Blue Jays players
Gulf Coast Blue Jays players
Kane County Cougars players
Kansas City Royals players
Major League Baseball pitchers
New Britain Rock Cats players
Northwest Arkansas Naturals players
Omaha Storm Chasers players
Sportspeople from Overland Park, Kansas
Peoria Javelinas players
Salt River Rafters players
San Antonio Missions players
Tampa Bay Rays players
Toronto Blue Jays players
Wilmington Blue Rocks players
2023 World Baseball Classic players